Raymond Victor Gurzynski (July 23, 1915 – April 22, 2010) was a track and field and American football player and coach. He served as the head football coach at Ursinus College in Collegeville, Pennsylvania from 1950 to 1959, compiling a record of 26–49–3.

Head coaching record

References

External links
 

1915 births
2010 deaths
Ursinus Bears football coaches
Ursinus Bears football players
College track and field coaches in the United States
Players of American football from Pennsylvania
Sportspeople from Lehigh County, Pennsylvania